Ogtay Dzhafarovich Aghayev (November 7, 1934 – November 13, 2006) was a Soviet, Azerbaijani variety singer and People's Artist of Azerbaijan.

Biography
Ogtay Aghayev was born in 1934, in Baku. In 1953, he entered Asaf Zeynally Music School in Baku. After coming from the army, he continued his education in the class of Firudin Mehdiyev. By 1958, he began to perform in Gaya Quartet. Later he became a soloist at Azerbaijan State Estrada Orchestra led by Rauf Hajiyev until 1970. Until 1984 he worked as soloist at Radio and Television Estrada Orchestra led by Tofig Ehmedov. In 1962, he performed at the State Kremlin Palace with this orchestra. Ogtay Aghayev also performed in tours in countries such as Algeria, Morocco, Poland, Czechoslovakia, Bulgaria, Romania and also in all republics of the former USSR.

He performed songs to films such as Find that girl, Struggle in the mountains, Bread to be shared, etc. Besides that, he also was shot as Melik Babanov – head of the NKVD - in Japan and Japanese film by Vagif Mustafayev. Ogtay Aghayev was also a laureate of the Humay Award.

Suffering from cardiovascular disease Ogtay Aghayev died in Baku on November 14, 2006.

Filmography 
 Abşeron ritmləri (Absheron rhythms)
 Bakı bağları. Buzovna (film, 2007)(Baku Gardens)
 Dağlarda döyüş (film, 1967)(Battle in the mountains)
 Xatirələr sahili (film, 1972)(Coast of memories)
 Konsert proqramı (film, 1971) (I)(Concert program)
 Mahnı qanadlarında (film, 1973)(On the wings of song)
 O qızı tapın (film, 1970)(Find that girl)
 Oqtay Ağayev. Ötən günlər (film, 2004)(Ogtay Agayev. Past Days)
 Şərikli çörək (film, 1969)(Shared Bread)
 Toyda görüş (film, 1970)(Meeting in the wedding)
 "Yapon" və yaponiyalı (film, 1990)

References

External links
 . Фрагмент фильма «Ритмы Апшерона». 1970 год.
 
 

1934 births
2006 deaths
Musicians from Baku
20th-century Azerbaijani male singers
Soviet male singers
Azerbaijani male film actors
Soviet male actors
20th-century Azerbaijani male actors
People's Artists of Azerbaijan
Soviet Azerbaijani people